Neat FM (Ghana) Neat FM is a private radio station in the Greater Accra Region that ultimately is run by the Despite Group of Companies. The station is both active on 100.9fm and online.  The station is one of few stations owned and run by the media group company Despite Group of Companies. The station focus on playing African Music and foreign musical genres. Neat FM provides "latest peculiar but true religious news content to its audience."

Notable personalities
Fadda Dickson

References

External links 
 NeatFMOnline.com 
 Online Streaming
 Facebook Community/Page

Radio stations in Ghana